The Ayrshire Coastal Path is a coastal long-distance hiking path in Ayrshire, Scotland. South of Glenapp, the route links with the Mull of Galloway Trail to Stranraer.

The path was developed by the Rotary Club of Ayr, and opened in June 2008. It is now designated as one of Scotland's Great Trails by NatureScot, and also forms part of the International Appalachian Trail.

The route is primarily designed for walkers, and as much of the middle and north sections are alongside beaches it is also suitable for horse riding. The northern section, between Ayr and Largs, is coincident with National Cycle Network routes 7 and 73 and is suitable for cyclists. About 3,000 people use the path every year.

See also
Scottish Coastal Way

References

External links

Ayrshire Coastal Path Official Website

Coastal paths in Scotland
Scotland's Great Trails
Ayrshire
Footpaths in South Ayrshire
Footpaths in North Ayrshire
2008 establishments in Scotland